Gary McDonald may refer to:

Gary McDonald (footballer, born 1969), English footballer
Gary McDonald (footballer, born 1982), Scottish footballer
Gary McDonald (actor) (born 1961), English actor
Gary McDonald (Australian footballer) (born 1953), former Australian rules footballer

See also
Gary MacDonald (disambiguation)
Garry McDonald (born 1948), Australian actor
Garry MacDonald (cricketer) (born 1956), New Zealand cricketer